Gisela Lisbeth Arrieta Betancourt (born 16 April 1987) is a Colombian footballer who plays as a midfielder and a forward for Greek A Division club PAOK FC and the Colombia national team.

College career
Arrieta has attended the Graceland University in the United States.

Club career
Arrieta has played for UCAB Spirit in Venezuela, for Dragonas Oriente in Mexico, for Houston Aces in the United States and for Elpides Karditsas and PAOK in Greece.

International career
Arrieta capped for Colombia at senior level during two Bolivarian Games editions (2005 and 2009) and two Copa América Femenina editions (2006 and 2010).

Managerial career
During her time as a player in Mexico, Arrieta also coached the Instituto Oriente Arboleda. In 2013, after graduating from the Graceland University, she became the women's team assistant coach.

References
Notes

Citations

External links

1987 births
Living people
People from Valledupar
Colombian women's footballers
Women's association football midfielders
Women's association football forwards
Graceland Yellowjackets women's soccer players
Elpides Karditsas players
PAOK FC (women) players
Colombia women's international footballers
Colombian expatriate women's footballers
Colombian expatriate sportspeople in Venezuela
Expatriate women's footballers in Venezuela
Colombian expatriate sportspeople in Mexico
Expatriate footballers in Mexico
Colombian expatriate sportspeople in the United States
Expatriate women's soccer players in the United States
Colombian expatriate sportspeople in Greece
Expatriate women's footballers in Greece
Colombian football managers
Female association football managers
Women's association football managers
College women's soccer coaches in the United States
Expatriate football managers in Mexico
Expatriate soccer managers in the United States
21st-century Colombian women